Cyclophora dispergaria is a moth in the  family Geometridae. It is found in Suriname.

References

Moths described in 1882
Cyclophora (moth)
Moths of South America